Uživo sa Egzit-a! / Live At Exit! is a live DVD release by the Serbian alternative rock band Disciplin A Kitschme, released by PGP RTS in 2006. The recording consists of the band performance at the 2005 Novi Sad Exit Festival. This is one of the first releases by the new, Belgrade version of the band.

Track listing 
All tracks by Koja.

Personnel

The band 
 Koja (Dušan Kojić) — bass, vocals, music by, lyrics by, mixed by, artwork by [design]
 Buca (Miloš Velimir) — drums, vocals
 Manja (Manja Đorđević) — vocals
 PP — percussion -

Additional personnel 
 Cvele (Miroslav Cvetković) — mastered by
 Vlada Marjanović — other [video post production]
 Stanislav Milojković — photography
 Boris Mladenović — recorded by

References

External links
 Uživo sa Egzit-a! / Live At Exit! at Discogs
 EX YU ROCK enciklopedija 1960-2006, Janjatović Petar; 

2006 video albums
Serbian-language albums
Disciplina Kičme albums
2006 live albums
Live video albums
PGP-RTS live albums
PGP-RTS video albums